Air Marshal Denzil Keelor PVSM, KC, AVSM, VrC (born 7 December 1933) is a retired  air officer of the Indian Air Force and a hero of the Indo-Pakistani War of 1965. He had a younger brother Trevor, who was also honoured for his service in the Indian Air Force. The brothers were both awarded the Vir Chakra for shooting down Pakistan Air Force Sabres.

Early life
Keelor was born on 7 December 1933 to Elizabeth and Charles Keelor in Lucknow. He attended St. Francis’ College, Lucknow.

Military career
Keelor was commissioned into the Indian Air Force on 6 November 1954. He scored a kill during the Indo-Pakistani War of 1965.

Vir Chakra
Denzil Keelor's first award was the Vir Chakra in 1965.  The citation for the Vir Chakra reads as follows:

Keelor took command of the 4 Squadron in early January 1973. The squadron was based out of Tezpur Air Force Station. In 1977, he took over as the Commandant of the Tactics and Air Combat Development Establishment (TACDE), the premier training establishment of the Indian Air Force which trains the best fighter pilots in aerial combat.

Kirti Chakra
The citation for the Kirti Chakra reads as follows:

From 1980 to 1982, Keelor served as the air attaché at the Embassy of India in Paris, France, in the rank of air commodore. He later took over command of the Maharajpur Air Force Station as air officer commanding.
Keelor was awarded with the Ati Vishist Seva Medal on 26 January 1986 and the Param Vishist Seva Medal on 26 Jan 1989.

He retired in 1991. Following his retirement he worked as the president of the YMCA for ten years. He was the chairman of Special Olympics Bharat.

Awards and decorations

References

1933 births
Living people
Indian Air Force air marshals
Indian Air Force officers
Indian aviators
Pilots of the Indo-Pakistani War of 1965
La Martinière College, Lucknow alumni
Recipients of the Vir Chakra
Recipients of the Param Vishisht Seva Medal
Recipients of the Ati Vishisht Seva Medal
YMCA leaders